Ithome ferax is a moth in the family Cosmopterigidae. It was described by Ronald W. Hodges in 1962. It is found in North America, where it has been recorded from Florida.

The wingspan is 7–10 mm.

References

Moths described in 1962
Chrysopeleiinae